This is a list of Bucknell Bison football players in the NFL Draft.

Key

Selections 
Selections as of the 2017 NFL Draft.

Notable Undrafted Players

References

Bucknell

Bucknell Bison NFL Draft